Klubi i Futbollit Tirana (KF Tirana) is an Albanian football club based in the country's capital city, Tirana. The men's football club is part of the multi-disciplinary sports club SK Tirana, and is the most successful in Albania, having won 54 recognized major domestic trophies. They play their home games at the Selman Stërmasi Stadium in Tirana and they play in the Kategoria Superiore.

The club was founded on 15 August 1920 as Sport Klub Tirana (in English: Sport Club Tirana), but then, they name changed to Shoqata e Futbollit Agimi (in English: Agimi Football Association) and they had since participated in all the top tier national championships ever held in Albania. However, the ninth-place finish in the 2016–17 season relegated the club to the Albanian First Division (second-tier) for the first time in their history.

They have competed under the name of SK Tirana between 1927 and 1947, when the communist regime forcibly renamed the club 17 Nëntori Tirana, Puna Tirana and KS 17 Nëntori. In 1991 KF Tirana retook its pre-1947 name and was divided into two branches, the multi disciplinary SK Tirana and the football branch of KF Tirana.

KF Tirana is the most successful Albanian team in European competitions, having progressed from the first rounds on 13 occasions (once directly by draw, without playing) since making their European debut in the 1965–66 European Cup. They reached Round of 16 in European Competitions four times, three such in the European Cup (now Champions League) alone in 1980s. The club also holds the record of being the highest ever ranking Albanian club according to IFFHS, having been ranked 31st in the world in 1987, following good results in their 1986–87 campaign. In addition, KF Tirana is an ECA member.

History

1920–1937: Beginnings of Klubi i Futbollit Tirana

Tirana was officially founded on 15 August 1920. The first coach was appointed Palok Nika. The first name of the club was Sportklub Tirona which was later changed into Futboll Klub Tirona. The team played their first official match in October at Shallvare against Juventus Shkodër.

Tirana played their first international match against Yugoslav team Crnogorac Cetinje from Montenegro in 1925. On 16 August 1927, which was the seventh anniversary of the formation of the Agimi Sports Association, the club's name changed into Sportklub Tirana, which would be commonly referred to as SK Tirana. On that day the president of the club was Teki Selenica.

in 1930, Tirana took part in the first officially recognised football competition held in Albania, organized by newly founded Albanian Football Association. The team dominated the tournament, reaching the final after winning five matches, drawing four and losing just one, to finish joint top, along with Skënderbeu Korçë, albeit with a slightly better goal difference. Tirana faced in the championship final Skënderbeu Korçë, who refused to play as a sign of protest against the bias of the competition and the Albanian Football Association towards Tirana. The club was named champion after the games were awarded 2–0.

The following season, the club introduced new players such as goalkeeper Vasfi Samimi, Sabit Çoku, Muhamet Agolli and Halim Begeja. The championship format changed as it divided the teams into two groups. Tirana was placed in Group A and managed to finish 1st after collecting five points from three matches. In the final against Group B winners Teuta Durrës, the team drew 1–1 in the first leg at home but managed a 3–0 win in the second one to retain the championship title.

Tirana continued to dominate the Albanian football even in the next season, despite the fact that the championship format was changed once again. In a group where every club would play each other twice and the winner would be decided by who finished top of the league, Tirana had it easy as they finished the championship unbeaten, winning five matches and drawing three, winning the title for the third consecutive year, which further cemented their place in history as the first club to dominate football in Albania. The club lost the title for the first time in history in 1933, finishing in a disappointing third place out of six, behind Bashkimi Shkodran and the winners Skënderbeu Korçë. It turned out to be a transition period as team bounced back firmly in the 1934 Championship, finishing five points ahead of runners-up Skënderbeu Korçë in a seven team format.

In the next years, Tirana managed to win the 1936 and 1937 championship, guided by ethnic-Albanian forward Riza Lushta who was named top goalscorer in both years. This was the last pre-World War II competition held by the Albanian Football Association as there was no championship held in 1938 and World War II broke out in 1939.

1939–1947: War years
In 1939, Albania was under Italian invasion; Giovanni Giro, a loyal trustee of Foreign Minister Galeazzo Ciano, was in charge of organising the first football competition under Victor Emmanuel III, which was called Turneja Kombëtare E Footbollit Për Ndeshjet E Trofeut Të Liktorit (National Tour of Football for the Matches of the Lictor Trophy). Tirana participated in the tournament, eliminating 9–0 on aggregate Dragoj Pogradeci in the first round to reach the semi-finals. In the semi-final, the team played Skënderbeu Korçë, beating them 3–0 to reach the final against Vllaznia Shkodër. In the final played at the Shallvare field in the capital on 30 September 1939, Tirana won the trophy by winning 6–5.

A similar tournament was held in the next year by the fascist regime, this time in a group format where teams were divided into two groups based on geography location. Two of Tirana's most important players Kryeziu and Lushta left Albania for Italy to join Bari and Roma respectively. In the first match, Tirana drew 2–2 with Vllaznia Shkodër, and then won 3–0 at home against Elbasani. The rest of the campaign did not prove to be fruitful as Vllaznia finished top of the group ahead of Tirana and reached the championship finals, where they defeated Skënderbeu Korçë 11–1 on aggregate to win their first national championship, to this day unrecognized by the Albanian Federal Association.

The championship was not held in 1941 but returned in the following year, which also had three clubs from Kosovo. These clubs from Kosovo competed in the northern section along with the reigning champions Vllaznia Shkodër and Tirana competed in the new middle section group and the southern clubs competed in their own group. In a bizarre ruling, only players born between 1921 and 1925 were allowed to participate in the competition, meaning that only players between the ages of 17 and 22 were allowed to play. However, this rule was not followed by most clubs and senior players did participate in the competition. Tirana reached the semi-finals after winning 5–1 versus Elbasani and drawing 1–1 against Teuta Durrës. In the semi-final, the team faced Prizreni; the first leg ended in a 2–2 draw while the second one was won by Tirana 2–1. The team thus reached the final once again where they faced Vllaznia Shkodër on 29 June. The regular time ended in a 1–1 draw, leading the Italian referee Michele Carone then asked both sides to play extra time of two 15-minute halves, but Vllaznia declined. Two days after the final had been played the match was awarded 2–0 to Tirana along with the title.

The club won two out of the three National Championships that were held during World War II, but in March 2013, Albanian Football Association made a decision by refusing to recognize them, stating that they were not legitimate, since they weren't organized by the AFA, but by the fascist regime.

1944–1957: Postwar period

Following the end of World War II, footballing activities resumed as they had done before the war under the guidance of the Albanian Football Association. In the championship of 1945, Tirana was placed in Group B. The team topped the group easily, collecting 16 points from 10 matches, thus reaching the final where they faced Vllaznia Shkodër once again. They lost both matches 2–1, thus missing the opportunity to win another championship.

Under communist regime led by dictator Enver Hoxha, Tiran would quickly become a victim as in early March 1946 the ruling communist Politburo had instructed the club to change its name to 17 Nëntori in honour of the Liberation of Tirana which took place on 17 November 1944. In the following decade, the club was subject to appalling treatment by the regime, and this was highlighted by the creation of a privilege system for the newly created communist backed teams Partizani Tirana and Dinamo Tirana.

The following decade would unroll in the same suffocating atmosphere, becoming even heavier after the foundation of two system-privileged teams that would follow the experiences of their sisters in the former USSR, former Yugoslavia, and the other eastern European countries: Partizani, the Defense Ministry team and Dinamo, the Internal Affairs Ministry team. Dozens of Tirana's talented players were "convinced", against their will, to play for either Partizani or Dinamo. As a result, "17 Nentori" struggled to stay at the top during the years 1947–57, however the team managed to gain some of the lost ground during the second part of the 1950s after replacing in part some of the first choice players of its line up.

1958–1990: Decline and revival 

From 1958 to 1964 Tirana kept on producing some good football and finishing the championship almost always at the third spot. These years were a prelude to what was about to happen later: Tirana reexperienced its pre-war glory spell under the services of the unforgettable coach Myslym Alla. At the end of the 28th national championship Tirana became champions of Albania more than twenty years after their last title.

The team repeated the success the year after, but this was an obvious challenge to Partizani's generals and Dinamo's secret service bosses.

1967 title unjustly denied 

It was 24 June 1967. Tirana and Partizani played their derby of the 19th round of 1967 Championship . Match had just been played in full and finished 2:1. Fans were peacefully leaving stands and, as players had already left the pitch and were heading towards dressing rooms, two of opposite players have just had a verbal exchange which ended there and then.

It was a huge surprise to see the paper headlines the next morning: "Due to direct decision of AFA, Tirana and Partizani forfeit the match 0:3, are deducted 3 points each and will thereafter lose by default remaining matches!"
Many were asking: "what went wrong, match was played in the pitch, it produced lots of emotions and fans acknowledged the final result. What did teams do to receive such a harsh treatment?"

However, it became clear days after: the decision to expel both clubs was taken directly from Ministry of Affairs and passed to AFA for execution. Since Partizani was out of title fight due to a huge point gap and the only way that Dinamo could get the title was punishing Tirana - table leaders at the moment, they finally found the excuse in that minor verbal exchange two players had after the match. Truth is they just couldn't support the fact that KF Tirana was about to achieve the 3rd title in a row, instead of Partizani or Dinamo. The day championship trophy was handed, Skënder Jareci, the manager of Dinamo, wouldn't take it on the traditional lap of honour, citing that Dinamo didn't truly deserve that title!

By forfeiting that match and losing the subsequent 3 remaining matches, Dinamo would automatically gain enough points to overtake Tirana and win the title. It was a disgrace for Albanian football, such that even UEFA still refrains to recognize the champions Dinamo for that year. The next season, because of the disqualification farce, Dinamo were denied entry to the European Cup by UEFA; their opponents, Braunschweig, received a walkover and eventually reached the quarter-finals.

Defiance 

After this, Tirana won the championship two years in a row in style, losing only two matches in 1968 and only one during the 1969–70 season.

During the seventies, Tirana struggled hard to stay at the top, the best result being the second place and the worst the thirteenth. Yet the club won the national cup twice. The generation of older players came to the end of their careers and this could only mark the end of a highly successful era. However the unsuccessful spell would not last long this time. Tirana won the championship at the end of the 1981–82 season, and they went on to win the title three other times during the eighties, in 1984–85, 1987–88 and 1988–89 and the Albanian Cup in 1982–83, 1983–84 and 1985–86. The club was also successful in European club competitions, reaching there the round of 16 four times in the 1980s, alone in the European Cup three times. Many of the team's players made up the core of the Albania national football team, such as Agustin Kola, Arben Minga, Shkëlqim Muça and Mirel Josa.

1991–2006: Return to success
In August 1991, less than a year following the fall of communism in Albania, Tirana regained its old name, and likewise the whole Albanian society, went through a period of profound changes. Almost all the best Albanian players left the country and went abroad looking for a richer team who could hire them. But it seems that the club simply could not stand being too long from the leading spots. The team returned to the winning ways by winning the Albanian Cup in the 1993–94 season, defeating 1–0 on aggregate Teuta Durrës. Shortly after, in January 1995, the team won also their first Albanian Supercup trophy, defeating 1–0 Teuta Durrës at Qemal Stafa Stadium. A couple of months later, they clinched their 15th championship by finishing 12 points ahead of the runner-up Teuta Durrës.

This championship was followed by another one in the 1995–96 season, as Tirana won it just one point ahead of Teuta Durrës once again. The team also clinched the cup in that season, completing the domestic double for the second time in history. Another domestic double followed in 1998–99 season. In the following years, Tirana continued to dominate the Albanian football, winning 10 out of the last 18 Albania's championships. The team also dominated in the domestic cups, adding to their trophy cabinet three Albanian Cups and five other Albanian Supercups.

2007–present: Refik Halili era

Following a successful 2006–07 campaign which saw the club win the Albanian Superliga comfortably, the team begun to struggle for results. They begun the season by getting eliminated from the UEFA Champions League by NK Domžale. Despite winning the Albanian Supercup versus Besa Kavajë, Tirana managed only a 6th-place finish their worst finish since 1993. In cup, the team lost the final to Vllaznia Shkodër.

In the following season, Tirana bounced back; inspired by striker Migen Memelli, who went on to score 30 goals, Tirana managed to win the championship for the 24th time in history. In cup they reached another final, only to be defeated again, this time by Flamurtari Vlorë. In the next years, Tirana experiences mixed fortunes, being unable to win the championship but remaining on top in domestic cups, winning the Albanian Cup in 2010–11 and 2011–12, and three other Albanian Supercups in 2009, 2011 and 2012. There was also major controversies off the field between club's chief and president in the 2010–11 season, which led to a delay in paying the players' wages and even some players not receiving their wages.

On 12 October 2011, Municipality of Tirana city council voted through a unanimous decision to change the status of the club from a municipality owned to a shareholder own one, under the name KF Tirana Sh.A, with the municipality of Tirana initially holding a 100% stake in the club but with the possibility of any future private sponsors and donors to own stocks in the club.

Starting from 2013, Tirana entered in a period of disappointments. In the 2013–14 season, the team was seriously in risk of getting relegated for the first time in history. By the end of December 2013 the team was ranked in the last position with only 10 points from 13 matches, 7 points away from the safe zone. However, with Gugash Magani as manager and a strong transfer market, the team bounced back and eventually finished in 6th position, escaping the relegation only in the penultimate match. On 26 June 2014, the Tirana city council approved a proposal to give private donors a 66% stake in the club's assets for the next 18 years, which at the time fell in the hands of Refik Halili and Lulzim Morina, which enabled such donors to invest in players, facilities and youth teams.

Tirana begun the 2014–15 season with high expectations, challenging for the title in the first part of the season. In the second part, however, the team declined and ultimately finished in 5th position. In cup, Tirana was controversially eliminated from Laçi in the semi-final 1–0 on aggregate. Laçi eventually won the final against Kukësi, leaving Tirana without Europa League football once again. The club was relegated during the 2016–17 season. From title contender halfway through the season, Tirana fell continuously to dramatically succumb to relegation for the first time in their history. Ilir Daja was sacked on 1 November following a goalless draw against Vllaznia Shkodër, and was replaced by the returned Mirel Josa. The club also broke the relationship with the fans after allowing with their lifetime rivals Partizani Tirana to play at Selman Stërmasi Stadium; they opposed such an agreement and subsequently abandoned the matches for the entire season as a result. Tirana then endured a 15 winless match streak before winning 2–0 against Korabi Peshkopi. Their relegation was officially confirmed on 27 May following a goalless draw versus fellow relegation strugglers Vllaznia Shkodër. In cup, Tirana did much better, winning their 16th trophy on 31 May after defeating 3–1 Skënderbeu Korçë at Elbasan Arena. This meant the return of Tirana in European competitions after five years.

Tirana retained most of their players ahead of the new season. The club appointed former Brazil international Zé Maria as the new manager. The team eliminated from the UEFA Europa League by Israel's Maccabi Tel Aviv In September 2017, Tirana won another trophy, their 11th Albanian Supercup after winning 1–0 against Kukësi. They also set a record by becoming the Albanian First Division side to win the Supercup. In the league Tirana dominated with hammering results in either home or away matches. Club's goal of a quick promotion in Superliga was reached with three spare rounds to play. Tirana won their first ever Albanian First Division title on 16 May by winning 2–0 against the Group A winners Kastrioti Krujë.

Tirana won the 25th championship in the 2019–20 season which was also the club's 100th anniversary. It was the first title after 11 years. During the season the team recorded two wins against Partizani, ending the negative record of 18 winless matches against them; the 5–1 win in February 2020 was the biggest since 2005. Ndubuisi Egbo took charge of the team starting in the 13th matchday; he was highly praised for his work and also become the first African coach to win a league title in Europe. In cup, the team managed to reach the final but was defeated 2–0 by Teuta.

Fresh from winning the title, Tirana was also successful in Europe, collecting over 1.5 million Euro reward from participation, advancing as far as the play-off stage of Europa League. With a healthy budget and having already players with a champion trophy and quality in their hands, club had the golden opportunity to start a cycle of domination for years to come. Club, however, failed to create such a status. They could not avoid key players parting ways and did not replace them with same or better elements. The COVID-19 pandemic also contributed negatively in many ways. Squad sustained many players' injuries and absences on the way as well, due to lack of substitutes. Thus, results were disappointing, especially at the first half of the season. Coach Egbo and director Laçi parted ways with the club at the ugliest possible way, even though they were the main key to success, radically changing Tirana within 2 years from promotion straight to the highest title. It was the day Tirana was eliminated just at the second round of the Cup from an inferior opponent, the moment that club found the "alibi" to sack them. 
The shameful way of Cup elimination did not at all make club reflect positively in the championship and the January players' market did not add to the team's quality, since January usually offers little alternatives. Despite efforts and better results in the second half of the season and led by an ambitious coach such as Shehi, Tirana ended 5th in the League and failed European participation.

Coach Shehi was promptly approved to continue with Tirana for the new season. This time, club did not make the previous mistakes in approving and approaching players from distance or video clips. Also they stopped seeking African players and ended their cooperation with agent Como. The recently appointer director, Osmani and director of academy, Muka played a great role in finding new players, mostly within the Superior League, North Macedonia and Kosovo. The new players also signed long-term contracts. Starting from talented Seferi, an affirmed forward of the previous season and also Xhixha arriving from KF Laçi as a free player at the end of his contract. Other significant players such as  Ennur Totre, Vesel Limaj, Visar Bekaj, Ardit Toli were also assigned with the club.
It was, nonetheless, a great merit of coach Shehi in managing the group of new arrivals, merging it with the existing lot and making it function perfectly well. Shehi also must be given the other merit of promoting players from the academy. Names such as Gjumsi, Përgjoni, Nikqi, Beshiraj, etc., left their mark in the success and promoted themselves as a bright future.
Subsequently, results arrived. Tirana created a steady point difference with the rivals, particularly winning the key matches. The positive side was also how team reacted even after the few defeats, showing character, quality and power. White and blues took the lead at 4th round and did not let go until the end. The point difference went to 16, at which point Tirana had the luxury to relax and allow draws or defeats, trying to give minutes to more young players in the pitch. Tirana won the championship for the 26th time, with 3 rounds to spare. Now club could peacefully work on preparations towards their European adventure, as well as consolidating the remaining contracts and the future team for the incoming season.
Focused fully in the championship progress, Tirana failed again in the Cup participation and for the second consecutive season were eliminated before even reaching the quarter finals.

Grounds

Shallvare (1920–46)

The club's first home ground was the Shallvare, located in the centre of Tirana where today is the existing Shallvare block, acquired by the club prior to their formation in 1920. The also field served as an amusement centre for the youth of Tirana to enjoy, and it was a popular gathering place where various games were played during religious holidays. Before its use as a football ground the site was use by the Ottoman garrison as a playground, and in 1916 it served as a runway for the Austrian-Hungarian Imperial and Royal Aviation Troops. The club played their first game at the Shallvare in 1920 against a team made up of the occupying Austrian-Hungarians. In 1925 there were changing rooms built at the ground, and in the early 1930s there was an athletics track built around the football pitch. The administrator of the ground was the football referee, Besim Hamdiu (Qorri), who only had one assistant in the maintenance of the ground. The ground did not have a main stand or seating area for spectators, but rather a two storied building that was constructed in 1923 by a member of parliament Masar Këlliçi . The building stood 50 metres away from the football pitch and was located in line with the middle of the pitch, with its balcony facing the field and the Dajt mountains. The ground was also used for other sporting events as well as military parades, one of which the president and later king Ahmet Zogu attended in 1927. The ground was destroyed in 1951 and Soviet–style apartment blocks were built onto of it instead.

Qemal Stafa Stadium (1946–2015)

The home ground of KF Tirana is Selman Stërmasi Stadium, which is shared with city rivals Dinamo Tirana and Partizani Tirana. However, most derby and significant matches are played at the national team's Qemal Stafa Stadium; the stadium is also used if the Selman Stërmasi Stadium is unavailable as it is used by three different teams. The club has expressed its desire to rebuild the current Selman Stërmasi Stadium into a modern complex with around 15,000 to 20,000 seats. They want it to be Albania's first modern post-Communism stadium without an athletic track around the field, which they hope will provide more atmosphere and attract more fans. However, it has not yet been decided when this will be built but it is rumoured to be the club's 100th anniversary present in 2020.

Selman Stërmasi Stadium (1956–present)

KF Tirana plays most of its official and friendly games at the Selman Stërmasi Stadium in Tirana. The Selman Stërmasi Stadium was built in 1956 and was previously named the 'Dinamo' Stadium until 1991 when it was permanently given its new name. The Football Association of Albania and the club decided to name the stadium post mortem after the eminent KF Tirana player, coach and president, Selman Stërmasi.

The stadium has a capacity of 12,500 (8,400 seated). In December 2014, another phase of reconstruction was started, involving a new pitch, central main covered stand, central fans stand including two extra rows extension, broken or missing seats replacements/repairs, interior facilities, general lineaments and a shopping center just under central seated. The internal facilities include general repairs, a press conference room, journalists' corner and modern showers. The side fans stands will temporary be shut and covered by advertising boards. It is still unclear when will stadium scoreboard and clock be fitted.

The main parking area is located at the front of the stadium, which leads to the entrance. The whole external part of the stadium is surrounded by a 2.7 M (9 ft) rail fence.

Skënder Halili Complex

The club's training ground is called the Skënder Halili Complex and it is located off Rruga e Kavajës, near the Birra Tirana factory. The training complex was posthumously named after Skënder Halili, who was one of the club's most notable associates, both during his playing career and after. The complex features a full sized natural grass football pitch, as well as a smaller astro turf fan along with dressing rooms used by senior team as well as some of the youth teams. In December 2014 work began on both the Skënder Halili Complex and the Selman Stërmasi Stadium in order to fully renovate these grounds to be used by the club, and at the training ground the training facilities were all improved which included the dressing rooms and even the single stand that holds a small number of spectators for those wishing to attend training sessions and even occasional friendlies that are played at the ground.

Supporters

Tirana is considered to be one of the most supported football clubs in Albania, and its supporters also formed the first Ultras group in the country in 1986 called 
Ultras Tirona. The group was forced to operate illegally as the communist regime did not allow such organised groups to function. However, despite this, its supporters used games as an outlet to show their dissent against the regime in place and following the fall of communism in Albania they became more organised and attracted more supporters in the late 90s and early 2000s. During the mid-2000s, younger supporters began to emerge on the scene and felt that the older Ultras Tirona did not entirely represent them, which led to the younger supporters forming a new Ultras group called the Tirona Fanatics on 8 January 2006. 
Tirona Fanatics are widely regarded as a right wing tifo-group, whereas Ultras Guerrils are mostly associated with the left due to their history. 
The group quickly rose in membership and became the most organised supporters group in Albania, following Tirana home and away, including European games. On 20 May 2015 the majority of the founding members of Tirona Fanatics decided to hand over the management of the group to younger supporters. The group has partnerships with
Macedonian group Shvercerat of FK Shkupi

Rivalries

The fans have three main rivals. Vllaznia Shkodër, the oldest derby in the country, with the matches between them called the All-time Albanian derby. The other rivalries are the Tirana derbies with Dinamo Tirana and Partizani Tirana. However, since 2010s, they have developed a fierce rivalry with Skënderbeu Korçë since the latter side's rise to prominence.

Players

Current squad

Tirana U21 and youth academy

Out on loan

Retired numbers

Other clubs

Tirana B

Klubi i Futbollit Tirana B is an Albanian football club based in Tiranë. It was founded in 1932, but was dissolved before it was refounded again on 22 January 2013.

Tirana U-21

KF Tirana U-21 is an Albanian football club based in Tiranë. It was founded in 2019.

Reserves and academy

The KF Tirana Reserves and Academy are the reserve team of KF Tirana, They play in the North section of the Albanian U-19 Superliga and Albanian U-17 Superliga.

Honours
Tirana are the most successful and decorated club in Albania, having won 26 league titles, a national record. The club's first trophy was also the first Albanian National Championship, held in 1930, which was also the first official football competition in the country. The club also holds the record for the most Albanian Cups (16) and Albanian Supercups (12). The club's most recent trophy was the 2022 Albanian Supercup won on 7 December 2022.

 Tirana have also won three more championships played during seasons 1939 , 1942 and 1967* . However, AFA have not yet officially recognized them.

Records

Domestic
Biggest ever home league victory: Tirana 11–0 Flamurtari Vlorë (5 July 1936)  Tirana 11–0 Besëlidhja Lezhë (6 June 1937)  Tirana 11–0 Erzeni (1960)
Biggest ever home league defeat: Tirana 0–6 Vllaznia Shkodër (1947) Tirana 0-6 Skënderbeu Korçë (1947)
Biggest ever away league victory: Elbasani 2–9 Tirana (12 June 1932) Pogradeci 1–8 Tirana (1953)
Biggest ever away league defeat: Partizani Tirana 8-0 Tirana (1947)
 Most league appearances:  Elvis Sina (392)
 Most league goals:  Indrit Fortuzi (152)
Most points in a season: 84 (2004–05)
Fewest points in a season: 7 (1940)
Most wins in a season: 26 (2004–05)
Fewest wins in a season: 3 (1931, 1933, 1940, 1942)
Most ties in a season: 15 (1974–75), (2016–17)
Fewest ties in a season: 0 (1939, 1946)
Most losses in a season: 13 (1972–73, 1976–77, 1991–92, 2016–17, 2018–19)
Fewest losses in a season: 0 (1932, 1936, 1937, 1939, 1942)
Best Goal Differential: +66 (1936)
Worst Goal Differential: -5 (1972–73)

Europe
Biggest ever European home victory: Tirana 5–0  Sliema Wanderers (Sept 27, 1989)
Biggest ever European home defeat:  Tirana 2–6  NK Croatia Zagreb (24 July 1996)
Biggest ever European away victory:  FC Gomel 0–2  Tirana  (14 July 2004)  FC Dinamo Tbilisi 0-2 Tirana (19 August 2020)
Biggest ever European away defeat:  Aalesund 5–0 Tirana  (26 July 2012)
 Most European appearances:  Elvis Sina (31)
 Most European goals:  Indrit Fortuzi (10)

KF Tirana statistics in Kategoria Superiore

Since the Kategoria Superiore began in 1930, KF Tirana have played 2060 Superliga matches, scored 3382 goals and conceded 1840. The club has collected so far 3065 points, won 1059 games, drawn 536 and lost 465. The club's goal difference is +1542 and the winning difference is +594.

Data correct up to the end of the 2021–22 season.

Recent seasons

Divisional movements

KF Tirana in Europe

In addition to being the leader team in all domestic competitions, KF Tirana have also given the best performances in Europe among Albanian squads winning 13 ties in Europe (including once directly by draw, without playing).

They reached Round of 16 in European Competitions four times, of which three times in the European Cup (now Champions League) alone in 1980s, making it the Albanian team to have progressed farthest in any European competition.

White and blues hold the all-time record for the highest IFFHS ranking of an Albanian football club, being ranked as high as 31st in the world in 1987, as result of good results preceded 1986–87.

In their European path, Tirana have played against "big guns" such as: Ajax, Bayern Munich, etc. Drawn against teams such as Dinamo București, Ferencváros, CSKA Sofia, Young Boys, Utrecht, Dinamo Zagreb, IFK Göteborg, Malmö FF, Standard Liège, Red Star Belgrade, etc.

In one of few team's best performances (the 2004–05 season) after having passed FC Gomel of Belarus in the first round 2:1 on aggregate, KF Tirana played against Ferencváros in the second round. Having lost the first leg 3–2 at home, Tirana led 1–0 in Budapest; however, they were unable to score the one extra goal they needed, having missed a penalty and hit the woodwork twice, and were eliminated on away goals, the tie finishing 3–3 on aggregate.

Reaching the European Cups is a play-off in the UEFA Europa League in 2020-2021
After the victory in Tbilisi against FC Dinamo Tbilisi 0–2 with the goals of Agustín Torassa and Marsel Ismailgeci in the first round of the Champions League, they are eliminated by Crvena Zvezda in the second round 0–1 in Tirana Air Albania Stadium , moving to the Europa League in the third round, which was qualified by lottery for the Play-off against BSC Young Boys, a match played in Bern where they were defeated 3–0, failing to qualify for the group stage of the Europa League.

European performance table

World and European rankings

UEFA club coefficient ranking
(As of 22 December 2022)

World club coefficient ranking
(As of 22 December 2022)

Records
Appearances in competitive matches
Below is the list with top ten players with most appearances in all competitions for KF Tirana.

Records Top Scores
All-time top 10goalscorers

Top scorers (Golden Boot)
List of Kategoria Superiore top scorers (Kategoria Superiore top scorers).

Historical list of coaches

Managerial record

(i) = interim

Current staff

Kit suppliers
Source:

KF Tirana Sponsorship

Presidential history
Tirana have had numerous presidents over the course of their history, some of which have been the owners of the club, others have been administrators and honorary presidents such as Bamir Topi and Fatmir Frashëri. The president has historically taken sole charge of the club, except for the period between 2007 and 2008, when was the presidency was formally vacant and numerous donors managed the club. The club have had a total of 13 president and 15 presidencies since 1920, with only Bamir Topi and Refik Halili having held the position on two occasions. The longest serving president is Selman Stërmasi who took charge of the club for 24 years between 1936 and 1960, whilst the shortest presidency belongs to Fatmir Frashëri, who took charge for one year between 2004 and 2005. Here is a complete list of club president from when Bahri Toptani took over at the club in 1920, until the present day.

KF Tirana's champions
(4 times or more)

See also
 Albanian football clubs in European competitions
 Tirana Rugby Club

Notes and references

Notes

References

External links

Official website
KF Tirana at UEFA.com
KF Tirana at Albanian Football Association

 
Football clubs in Tirana
Sport in Tirana
Football clubs in Albania
Association football clubs established in 1920
1920 establishments in Albania